St. Bonaventure Bonnies basketball may refer to either of the basketball teams that represent St. Bonaventure University:
St. Bonaventure Bonnies men's basketball
St. Bonaventure Bonnies women's basketball